Midori Kiuchi (September 25, 1950
– November 18, 2019) was a Japanese actress. Beside acting, she was a Japanese representative of the Norbulingka Institute. She supported the maintenance and inheritance of the culture of Tibet.  She was born in Nagoya, Aichi Prefecture, Japan.

Filmography

TV series

Films

References

External links
Kiss Port: Midori Kiuchi 

Japanese actresses
1950 births
2019 deaths
People from Nagoya